Roger Cisneros (January 22, 1924 – September 18, 2017) was an American politician who served in the Colorado Senate from 1965 to 1977.

He died of carbon monoxide poisoning on September 18, 2017, in Denver, Colorado at age 93.

References

1924 births
2017 deaths
Democratic Party Colorado state senators
People from Taos County, New Mexico